The 1973 Rainier International Tennis Classic – Singles was an event of the 1973 Rainier International Tennis Classic tennis tournament played at the Seattle Center Arena in Seattle, Washington, in the United States between September 10 and September 16, 1973. Ilie Năstase was the defending champion, but did not compete in this edition. Second-seeded Tom Okker won the singles title, defeating John Alexander 7–5, 6–4 in the final.

Seeds

Draw

Finals

Top half

Bottom half

References

External links
 ITF tournament edition details

Rainier International Tennis Classic